Sara "Sally" Kelly is a Democratic former member of the New Hampshire House of Representatives, representing the Merrimack 7th District from 2006 through 2014.

External links
New Hampshire House of Representatives - Sally Kelly official NH House website
Project Vote Smart - Representative Sara 'Sally' Kelly (NH) profile
Follow the Money - Sara (Sally) Kelly
2006 campaign contributions

Members of the New Hampshire House of Representatives
Living people
Women state legislators in New Hampshire
Year of birth missing (living people)
People from Chichester, New Hampshire
21st-century American women